Dale Jones may refer to:
 Dale Jones (runner)
 Dale Jones (American football)
 Dale Jones (baseball)